Rony Gruber (born January 15, 1963) is an Israeli film director and screenwriter. He is best known as the director and co-producer of Are You This Able?, nominated for best documentary at the Ophir Award.

Biography
Rony Gruber was born in Tel Aviv and graduated the prestigious Tichon Hadash High school, majoring in arts. He made his first steps in the film industry as a lighting technician. As a freshman in Tel Aviv University's Film & TV department, he joined up forces with a group of young and promising filmmakers, later to be credited for Israeli cinema renaissance. His work as a gaffer in the student films of Arik Kaplon, Yair Lev, Shemi Zarhin and Gur Heller and his work with acclaimed directors Amos Guttman on "Himmo, King of Jerusalem" by Yoram Kaniuk and Ze'ev Revach on Bouba, sharpened his aesthetic perception and enriched his cinematic language.

Advertising
Following his studies, Gruber established a directorial career in the advertising business, soon to become an award winning commercials director, with Israeli and international credits. His clients included Volvo, Ocean Spray, P&G, Mazda, Ikea, Pizza Hut, Chevrolet, Whirlpool, Holiday Inn, Mitsubishi and more. In his 20-year career he received a Golden Drum Award, and several Golden Cactus Awards.

Film career
His first film was The Room (1987), a one-act drama by Harold Pinter. His second film Are You This Able? (2001) premiered in the Haifa International Film Festival and participated in film festivals around the world. Israeli critic Amir Kaminer wrote about the film: "Rony Gruber's sensitive and human documentary is sheer exhilaration. A sweet moment of victory...." Critic Nir Kipnis wrote in Globes, "The biggest achievement of the film in offering us a fresh point of view of the emotional world of the mentally disabled. The world portrayed in Are You This Able? seems so similar to our own and yet it differs elusively in the way it is manifested...."

In 2002 he collaborated with praised writer Yitzhak Ben Ner in the writing of the script for the fictional feature film Nicole's Stations, commemorating 30 years to the Yom Kippur War and based on Ben Ner's novel Rustic Sunset. The script was commissioned by the Makor Film Fund.

In 2003 Gruber directed a five-episode reality television series commissioned by Israel Broadcasting Authority. The series portrays day-to-day life at the Herods Theme Hotel in Eilat using it as an allegory of Israeli society's hedonistic and extroverted existence. The music was written by composer Avi Benjamin.

In 2007 he directed episodes in the critically acclaimed TV drama Room Service featuring Asi Levi, Sasha Damidov, Danny Steg, Yehezkel Lazarov and others. Gruber is currently developing two documentaries: In Golda's Shoes, a portrait of Golda Meir, and There We Sat and Wept ... in collaboration with Prof. Yossi Yona, telling the story for Iraqi Diaspora longing to Iraqi Jews driven out of Baghdad in the 1940.

Other
Rony Gruber served three terms (2007–2010) as a board member at AIDF (Association of Israeli Documentary Filmmakers) and wrote its articles of association. He has been invited to be a member of the Readers Committee at The Israel Film Fund and the Makor Film Fund. Through the years he has been teaching cinema, among others, in Ma'ale Film School, Kinneret Academic College and Habetzefer.

In 2001 he was awarded the Akim Excellence Award presented annually by the president of Israel.

References

External links

Are You This Able 
 Are You This Able at the Israeli Film Academy
 Are You This Able in EDB
 
 
  Mentions Are You This Able at the Brooklyn Jewish Film Festival.
 Are You This Able in The Jewish Pittsburgh Film Forum
 "Jealousy" - a scene from the movie on YouTube
 "Loving and Losing Yourself" - a scene from the movie on YouTube

The Palace

Room Service 
 Watch all episodes of Room Service
 Please Disturb Room Service in Ynet
 Room Service in Tel Aviv Mouse
 Room Service in IMDb

In Golda's Shoes 
 Excerpt from the footage: an interview with Golda Meir's son
 Excerpt from the footage: an interview with Golda Meir's son, part 2

Personal 
 
 Rony Gruber as lecturer at Ma'ale Film School
 Rony Gruber in the Israeli filmmakers database
 

1963 births
Living people
Film people from Tel Aviv
Israeli film directors
Israeli male screenwriters
Tel Aviv University alumni